Rosendo Álvarez Gastón (August 10, 1926 – February 3, 2014) was a Spanish Catholic bishop.

Ordained to the priesthood in 1951, he was appointed bishop of the Diocese of Jaca, Spain, in 1985. In 1989, he became bishop of the Diocese of Almeria retiring in 2002,

Notes

1926 births
2014 deaths
20th-century Roman Catholic bishops in Spain